ACES Educational Center for the Arts (ECA), is an American public arts magnet high school, located at 55 Audubon Street in New Haven, Connecticut, United States.

The school is primarily located in the former Congregation Mishkan Israel synagogue with studio spaces across the street. The school has two theaters — the Arts Hall in the main building, and the Little Theatre  at 1 Lincoln Street — and multiple gallery spaces throughout the main building.

The school enrolls approximately 260 students and is divided into five departments: Music, Dance, Theater, Creative Writing, and Visual Arts. Students take academic courses at their "sending schools" (public high schools) during the morning and attend classes within their departments during the afternoon from 1:00 to 4:00, Monday through Thursday.

Notable alumni 

 Lauren Ambrose (born 1978) Broadway actress and singer.
 Tom Burr (born 1963) a conceptual artist.
 Wayne Escoffery (born 1975) a jazz saxophonist.
 Kaliegh Garris (born 2000) model and beauty pageant titleholder.
Sam Levinson (born 1985)  actor and filmmaker. Best known for creating the HBO teen drama series Euphoria (2019–present).
 Kim Nalley (born 1969) jazz and blues singer.
Brenda Zlamany (born 1959) painter and portraitist.

References

Public high schools in Connecticut
Art schools in Connecticut
Schools in New Haven, Connecticut